Toofan Harirod  (Persian: , which translates to storm of the Harirod) is a professional football club from Afghanistan. They play in the Afghanistan Champions League. It was founded in August 2012, by the creation of Afghan Premier League and its players were chosen through a casting-show called Maidan-E-Sabz (Green Field). Based in the city of Herat, the club represents  provinces of Herat, Farah, Ghor and Badghis in the western region of Afghanistan.

Toofan Harirod became champions of the first season of Premier League, defeating Simorgh Alborz 2–1, in final of the 2012 Afghan Premier League. They earned their second and third title against Shaheen Asmayee in final of the 2018 Afghan Premier League and 2019 Afghan Premier League through extra time, by score of 1–0.

Honours

National
Afghan Premier League
Champions (3): 2012, 2018, 2019
Runners-up (1):  2021

References

Toofan Harirod F.C.
Football clubs in Afghanistan
Herat
2012 establishments in Afghanistan
Association football clubs established in 2012